Nurlatsky District or Norlat District was a district (raion) of the Tatar ASSR that existed in the 1920s–1960s.

It was established as Nurlat-Achysarsky District on February 14, 1927.  Its administrative center was the village (selo) of Nurlaty.

On August 1, 1927 it was renamed Nurlatsky.  On February 1, 1963, the district was abolished and its territory merged into Zelenodolsky District.

References

History of Tatarstan
Nurlatsky District